Edward Mildred (born 10 April 2003) is a British swimmer. He competed in the men's 200 metre butterfly event at the 2021 FINA World Swimming Championships (25 m) in Abu Dhabi.

References

External links
 

2003 births
Living people
British male butterfly swimmers
Place of birth missing (living people)
Swimmers at the 2022 Commonwealth Games
Commonwealth Games medallists in swimming
Commonwealth Games silver medallists for England
Commonwealth Games bronze medallists for England
21st-century English people
European Aquatics Championships medalists in swimming
English male swimmers
Sportspeople from Northampton
Medallists at the 2022 Commonwealth Games